Graphocephala atropunctata, commonly known as the blue-green sharpshooter, is a hemipteran bug endemic to California. It carries the phytopathogenic bacteria Xylella fastidiosa which infects the xylem of grape vines causing die-back – known as Pierce's disease. This leads to loss of productivity and economic damage to the California vineyards.

References

Cicadellini
Insects described in 1854